is a 1974 Japanese film in Nikkatsu's Roman porno series, directed by Chūsei Sone and starring Junko Miyashita.

Synopsis
In historical times, the Shogun family employs a group of Iga ninjas to take over the Akizuki clan's lands. The Akizuki hire the Fumi ninjas, a group of female warriors who enhance their fighting ability with sexual magic such as the "white snake spell". When the Akizuki emerge victorious, Tsukinojo, the leader of the Fumi ninjas, marries Lord Akizuki.

Cast
 Junko Miyashita: Tsukinojo 魔羅月之丞 
 Kyōko Kanō: White Snake Woman
 Hitomi Kozue: White Snake Woman
 Yūko Katagiri
 Yuri Yamashina: Blue Fox
 Setsuko Ōyama: Koyuki
 Maya Hiromi: O-kei
 Hajime Tanimoto: Mamoru Wakasa
 Keisuke Yukioka: Sansaemon Horiguchi
 Hiroshi Osa: Hattori Hanzō
 Nagatoshi Sakamoto: Norizen Kuroiwa
 Hyōe Enoki: Kamekubi
 Tadayuki Kitakami: Gankubi
 Hitomi Kozue: お真知の方 
 Naomi Oka: お蓮の方 
 Tatsuya Hamaguchi: Ōmi
 Kenji Shimamura: Old man

Background
The film anticipates the theme of Toei's In Bed With the Enemy: Female Ninjas (1976) which itself spawned several imitations. In their Japanese Cinema Encyclopedia: The Sex Films, the Weissers write that this indicates Nikkatsu's ability to keep current with the moods of popular culture. During the mid-1970s, when director Sone's output was uneven, the Weissers judge the film to show him at his best. It also serves as an example, they write, of popular actress Yūko Katagiri's variable career. Previously promoted as a star, her career had stalled due to her typecasting in teenage roles. She had expanded her acting range by starring in Tatsumi Kumashiro's successful Wet Lust: 21 Strippers (1974). By the time of the release of Female Ninja Magic: 100 Trampled Flowers, however, her star had again faded and she was relegated to fourth billing. Allmovie writes that the film is an "action-packed softcore melodrama".

Availability
Female Ninja Magic: 100 Trampled Flowers was released theatrically in Japan on August 3, 1974. It was released to home video in VHS format on December 2, 1996.

Bibliography

English

Japanese

Notes

1974 films
Films directed by Chūsei Sone
1970s Japanese-language films
Nikkatsu films
Ninja films
Nikkatsu Roman Porno
1970s Japanese films